Kürecik Radar Station is a military installation located in the town of  in Malatya Province, southeastern Turkey. It was established in 2012 for use by NATO as an early-warning radar against ballistic missile attacks.

Background
At the NATO Lisbon summit in November 2010, a strategic plan was concluded to establish a ballistic missile defense system covering all alliance members. As a NATO member state, the government of Turkey approved the installation of an early-warning radar system on its territory, but insisted on a condition that all the information gathered at the radar station would be strictly for use by the NATO member states. After signing an agreement on final conditions in September 2011, officials from Turkey and the U.S. determined a site near the town of Kürecik in the Akçadağ district of Malatya Province as feasible. In the 1960s, the site hosted a radar base for surveillance of the Soviet Union airspace. In the 1970s and early 1980s it was manned by a small US Air Force contingent and used as a communications relay site connecting Incirlik CDI with Diyarbakir and Erhaç air bases. Site security was provided by the Turkish military during those years as well.

Controversy
The residents of Kürecik and many others from the region expressed their opposition and mounted protests right after the announcement of the radar site. In September 2011, Iran criticized Turkey for the establishment of the early-warning radar in southeastern Turkey, fearing it would serve to protect Israel from Iranian missile attacks in case of a war.

Installation and operation
The installation of the radar system was carried out by U.S. military personnel. The establishment of the radar station was completed in February 2012. The radar station's control was transferred to NATO command in the frame of the European Phased Adaptive Approach (EPAA). 

The installed radar is an Army Navy/Transportable Radar Surveillance (AN/TPY-2), a Forward-Based X-Band Transportable (FBX-T) surveillance radar developed by Raytheon Integrated Defense Systems, featuring long-range, very high-altitude active electronically scanned array. The radar site's command center is at Diyarbakır Air Base east of Kürecik. 

The Kürecik radar station's mission is to relay tracking and discrimination data to a remote missile defense system, the Terminal High Altitude Area Defense (THAAD), stationed in Romania and Poland. Radar range data varies widely as the AN/TPY-2 is used both in forward-based and terminal-based modes. The Kürecik radar as a forward-based radar is deployed in a reasonable proximity to the assumed missile launch site. About 50 U.S. soldiers were deployed to the radar station for protection and internal security. The Turkish government did not allow foreign civilian technicians at the site for intelligence concerns. Turkey took the responsibility for the external protection of the radar site, which is situated in an isolated region, against sabotage attacks. A team of the Engineer Research and Development Center's (ERDC) Cold Regions Research and Engineering Laboratory (CRREL) from the U.S. Army Corps of Engineers provided technical solutions for the military personnel stationed at the high-elevation Kürecik radar site, where harsh weather conditions occur in winter time.

The early-warning radar is owned by the U.S. Army, and operated by the U.S. Army Europe.

See also
 Pirinçlik Air Base, a former radar base in southeastern Turkey.
 Kisecik Radar Station in Hatay Province, southern Turkey

References

Military installations of the United States in Turkey
NATO installations in Turkey
Military installations established in 2012
2012 establishments in Turkey
Military in Malatya
Buildings and structures in Malatya Province
Akçadağ